Tara Susan Haelle, known professionally as Tara Haelle, (born January 20, 1978) is an American photojournalist, educator, author, and science writer. Haelle, along with co-author Emily Willingham, published The informed parent : a science-based resource for your child's first four years, which examines several child raising controversies. She examined the history and science of vaccines in a 2018 book entitled Vaccination investigation. In addition, Haelle has written several children's educational books, including Edible Sunlight, and Seasons, Tides, and Lunar Phases.

Biography
Tara Haelle was born in Alameda County, CA in 1978. She earned a Bachelor of Arts in English at the University of Texas at Austin and a Master of Arts in photojournalism, also from the University of Texas. She has also written four articles for Scientific American.

Haelle and Willingham's book, Informed Parent has received generally positive reviews from various book reviewers. According to noted vaccine researcher, Dr. Paul Offit, "In The Informed Parent, journalists Tara Haelle and Emily Willingham manage to answer everything a parent could possibly be worried about during pregnancy, birth, infancy, and toddlerhood. What makes this book different from every other book on this subject (and there are many) is that the authors take on not only the science of what concerns us, but encourage us to think along with them—giving us the tools to answer other questions in the future. It was like reading the answer sheet before the test."

Haelle co-authored a paper that examined the effects of images in vaccine newspaper and magazine articles. It found that one in eight articles had negative images of vaccines.

Blogs

She is a writer at Forbes.com, Everyday Health, and numerous other websites. Haelle blogs about science, child rearing, childbirth, and vaccines at Forbes and Red Wine and Applesauce. Much of her writing is about vaccine controversies, usually examining and reviewing published articles about various vaccines. She has criticized noted anti-vaccination activist Dr. Bob Sears and critiqued the controversial documentary Vaxxed.

Publications
 
 
 
 
 
 
 
 
 
 
 Haelle, Tara, "This Is the Moment the Anti-Vaccine Movement Has Been Waiting For" New York Times  Aug. 31, 2021 online

References

External links

Vaccination advocates
American science writers
American photojournalists
American bloggers
University of Texas alumni
1978 births
American children's writers
American medical writers
Women medical writers
Science bloggers
Living people
21st-century American non-fiction writers
American women bloggers
21st-century American women writers
American women non-fiction writers